Hordeum cordobense is a species of wild barley in the grass family Poaceae, native to northern Argentina. A diploid found below , its closest relative is Hordeum muticum, a highland species with a more northerly distribution.

References

cordobense
Endemic flora of Argentina
Flora of Northwest Argentina
Flora of Northeast Argentina
Plants described in 1980